Persatuan Sepakbola Luwu (simply known as PS Luwu) is an Indonesian football club based in Luwu Regency, South Sulawesi. They currently compete in the Liga 3.

Players

Current squad

Sponsorship
 Dwi Area
 Pemuda Pancasila Kabupaten Luwu
 PT Masmindo
 Alonzo Tri Mulya
 Ubas Extreme
 Marflex (apparel)

References

External links

Sport in South Sulawesi
Football clubs in Indonesia
Football clubs in South Sulawesi